Traianos Dellas (born 31 January 1976) is a Greek football manager and former professional footballer, who played as a centre back. He was an integral part of Greece's Euro 2004 winning squad, during which he became the only player to score a silver goal in an international football match. He last managed Super League club Panetolikos.

Club career

Aris
Dellas started playing football in 1993 at Aris for two years, where he helped the club of Thessaloniki to qualify for the 1994–95 UEFA Cup. He played alongside Fanis Katergiannakis, with whom they won Euro 2004 with Greece in Portugal.

Panserraikos
In the summer of 1994 Dellas was loaned to Panserraikos for two seasons, where he played as regular.

Sheffield United
Dellas returned to Aris again before joining Sheffield United in England. Dellas is best remembered by Sheffield United fans for a game against Tranmere Rovers in March 1999. With United 2–0 down, Dellas came on as a substitute and scored twice as they won 3–2. His other goal with " the Blades" was an amazing 30-yard strike in a home game against Portsmouth which was also a late winner.

AEK Athens
In 1999 Dellas returned to Greece to sing for AEK Athens in a recommendation of Vasilis Dimitriadis. He won the Greek Cup in 2000 playing alongside players such as Demis Nikolaidis and Vasilios Tsiartas. Dellas had a fairly good presence for two years in the team, but the intense competition that existed in the positions of central defenders and his lack of speed resulted in 2001 with the then presindent, Makis Psomiadis and the coach, Fernando Santos, considering the huge number of center backs in the roster, to release him.

Perugia
After this departure from AEK, Dellas signed for the Italian club, Perugia. However, Dellas was dropped from Perugia's first team after a disagreement over his contract and he did not make a single appearance in the last six months of the season, playing only eight matches overall.

Roma
After leaving the club Dellas caught the attention of Serie A club Roma and he joined the team on a free transfer in 2002.
After finally establishing himself as a starter following the move of coach Fabio Capello to Juventus, Dellas's performances were outstanding. He earned the peculiar honour of being one of three players alongside Francesco Totti and Vincenzo Montella who were not consistently booed by the fans during training and games during Roma's disastrous 2004–05 season. After failing to renew his contract with the club, Dellas became a free agent. He would eventually miss nearly 8 months of football due to back and hernia injuries and thus, expected offers from the big clubs of Europe failed to materialize.

Return to AEK Athens
In the summer of 2005 Dellas decided to return to AEK, where his former teammate and good friend Demis Nikolaidis was the president. He renewed his contract in June 2007 for a further two years and became team captain. Here Dellas played alongside players like Rivaldo, Pantelis Kafes and the talented Sokratis Papastathopoulos. In AEK came very close of winning the league, but the opportunity was lost due to the "Valner affair" and the title went to Olympiacos. On 23 July 2008, Dellas and AEK agreed to terminate his contract by mutual consent after failing to agree on a new contract.

Anorthosis
On 24 July 2008 agreed to sign a two-year deal with Cypriot football club Anorthosis Famagusta. Dellas helped the team to qualify for the UEFA Champions League in the season 2008–09, in the same group with his rival club when he was at AEK, Panathinaikos and Inter Milan of José Mourinho.

Third spell at AEK Athens
On 5 June 2010, Dellas agreed to sign with AEK Athens again, this time for one year, possibly intending to end his career at the team he supports. Nikos Liberopoulos also returned at the club and alongside Dellas formed their leading duo. On 12 December 2010, Dellas scored his first goal in the Greek championship after two years' absence, against AEL. On 16 March 2011 he scored in the semi-final of the cup against PAOK and sent AEK to the final of the tournament. On 30 April 2011, Dellas won with AEK his second Cup. He played at AEK for one more season when on 26 May 2012, Dellas announced his retirement from professional football.

International career

Dellas earned his first cap for Greece in April 2001 in a 2–2 draw with Croatia. Dellas had an exceptional tournament at Euro 2004, partnering again with his former teammate at AEK, Michalis Kapsis in the centre of what became an almost impenetrable Greek defence, leading to him being voted onto the tournament all-star squad. During the semi-finals, he scored the only silver goal ever in the last minute of first half of extra time against the Czech Republic, allowing Greece to progress to the final. This was his only goal for the Greek squad. The coach of Greece called him 'the Colossus of Rhodes' in respect of his performances in the tournament and the moniker is now widely used in the press.

After Euro 2004, Dellas continued to be the heart of the Greek defense, but missed nearly eight months in 2005 due to injury. His absence was seen as a major factor in Greece's failed 2006 FIFA World Cup qualifying campaign. Two years later, Dellas helped Greece qualify for Euro 2008 but could not find his form of 2004 as Greece exited the group stage without any points and having scored just one goal. He was also part of the 2010 FIFA World Cup qualifying campaign but was not called up after the victory over Israel on 1 April 2009. Subsequently, he was not included in the provisional squad for the 2010 FIFA World Cup.

Managerial career
On 4 April 2013, Dellas was appointed as AEK Athens's new coach, replacing Ewald Lienen, with Akis Zikos being appointed as assistant manager. Following AEK's relegation from the Super League, Dellas remained at the club's wheel in Greece's third division, instead of the second tier in order to clear the team's debts. He successfully led the team back in the Super League in 2015. On 20 October 2015, Dellas resigned, after a 4–0 loss to Olympiacos.

On 7 November 2015, he signed a contract with club Atromitos. On 12 January 2018, he signed a contract with Panetolikos. He resigned on 19 April 2019. On 10 November 2020, Panetolikos announced his return as the manager of the club in a need of gaining points for avoiding relegation. His second tenure ended officially on 5 June 2021, after the club thanking him for having successfully avoided relegation for the club, which was achieved thanks to an away goal in a (2–1) defeat, and a late goal victory at home (1–0) in the 2nd leg of the relegation play-offs.

Personal life
Dellas married Greek model Gogo Mastrokosta on 11 September 2008. They have one daughter.

Career statistics

International

Scores and results list Greece's goal tally first, score column indicates score after each Dellas goal.

Managerial

Honours

As a player

AEK Athens
Greek Cup: 1999–2000, 2010–11

Greece
UEFA European Championship: 2004

Individual
UEFA European Championship Team of the Tournament: 2004
Nova Awards Best Greek Superleague Team: 2010–11

As a manager

AEK Athens
Football League 2: 2013–2014 (Group 6)
Football League: 2014–15

References

External links

Official website

1976 births
Living people
Footballers from Thessaloniki
Greek Macedonians
Greek football managers
Greek footballers
Greece international footballers
Greece under-21 international footballers
Association football central defenders
Anorthosis Famagusta F.C. players
AEK Athens F.C. players
Aris Thessaloniki F.C. players
Panserraikos F.C. players
A.C. Perugia Calcio players
A.S. Roma players
Sheffield United F.C. players
Serie A players
Super League Greece players
Cypriot First Division players
English Football League players
UEFA Euro 2004 players
UEFA Euro 2008 players
UEFA European Championship-winning players
AEK Athens F.C. managers
Atromitos F.C. managers
Panetolikos F.C. managers
Greek expatriate footballers
Greek expatriate sportspeople in Cyprus
Expatriate footballers in Cyprus
Greek expatriate sportspeople in Italy
Expatriate footballers in Italy
Greek expatriate sportspeople in England
Expatriate footballers in England